The Guardian Angel Tour was a concert tour by Canadian-American musician Alanis Morissette. The tour promoted her August 2012 album Havoc and Bright Lights. The tour ran from June to December 2012 and took place in Europe, North America and South America, including the countries of United Kingdom, France, Switzerland, Belgium, Netherlands, Germany, Austria, Czech Republic, Italy, Brazil and Israel.

Opening act
Souleye (select dates)
Athlete (November 28–30, 2012)

Setlist
The following songs were performed at the Nokia Hal in Tel Aviv, Israel on December 3, 2012. It does not represent all concerts during the tour.

"Woman Down"
"All I Really Want"
"You Learn"
"Guardian"
"Mary Jane"
"Receive"
"Right Through You"
"So Pure"
"Ironic"
"Havoc"
"Head over Feet"
"Lens"
"21 Things I Want in a Lover"
"Uninvited"
"You Oughta Know"
"Numb"
Acoustic Set
"Empathy"
"Hand in My Pocket"
"Your House"
Encore
"Thank U"

Tour dates

Festivals and other miscellaneous performances
Montreux Jazz Festival
Rock Zottegem
Bospop
Colours of Ostrava
Live at Sunset
Hydrogen Festival
City Sound Milano
Luglio suona bene
Bosom Ball

Cancellations and rescheduled shows

Personnel
 Alanis Morissette – vocals/guitar/harmonica
 Julian Coryell – guitar
 Michael Farrell – keyboards
 Jason Orme – guitar
 Cedric Lemoyne – bass guitar
 Victor Indrizzo – drums

Personnel credits are taken from Morissette's official website.

References

2012 concert tours
Alanis Morissette concert tours